Khaled Abdul Gasem Othman Feghi Saleh or خالد عبد الجاسم عثمان فائقه صالح (born 1 December 1968) is a former Libyan sprinter who competed in the men's 100m competition at the 1996 Summer Olympics. He recorded an 11.65, not enough to qualify for the next round past the heats. His personal best is 11.15, set in 1997.

References

1968 births
Living people
Libyan male sprinters
Athletes (track and field) at the 1996 Summer Olympics
Olympic athletes of Libya